Antoine Dubuclet Jr. (1810 – December 18, 1887) was the State Treasurer of Louisiana from 1868 to 1878. Before the American Civil War, Dubuclet was one of the wealthiest African Americans in the nation. After the war, he was the first person of African descent to hold the office of Louisiana treasurer.

Early life
Dubuclet was born in Iberville Parish near Baton Rouge. He was the son of Antoine Dubuclet Sr., and Marie Felecite Gray. Both were free blacks; his father was part owner of Cedar Grove, a successful sugar plantation, which he had inherited from his parents, Joseph Antoine Dubuclet and Rosie Belly. Upon his father's death, his mother moved to New Orleans with her younger children; Dubuclet took over his father's responsibilities and assisted in managing the plantation which held more than seventy slaves. In 1834, the plantation was divided between Dubuclet and his siblings.

Family
In the mid-1830s he met and married Claire Pollard, a wealthy free woman of color who owned a plantation and 44 slaves. This marriage lasted till her death in 1852. His successful management of both his and his wife's properties allowed him to acquire additional properties, which included a plantation on the west bank of the Mississippi upriver from New Orleans. By 1860, he owned more than one hundred slaves and was considered the wealthiest black slaveholder in Louisiana.
His first wife, Claire, died in 1852. They had nine children together, and sent them to France for their education. Several of his daughters remained there and married Frenchmen. Two of his sons received degrees in medicine. In the early 1860s, he remarried Mary Ann Walsh. They had three children.

Later career
The Civil War devastated the sugar industry in Louisiana and impoverished Dubuclet along with his fellow planters.

Political career
In 1868, Dubuclet was nominated as the Republican candidate for state treasurer. Later that year, Dubuclet along with the entire Republican ticket won the election. Dubuclet took financial charge of a bankrupt state. Dubuclet along with other members of the state administration were successful in reducing the state's debt. He was joined in this work by two of his sons, who served as his clerks. Dubuclet was reelected both in 1870 and 1874. Dubuclet was the only office holder allowed to remain in office during the minor coup d'état, known as the Battle of Liberty Place that occurred in September 1874. Dubuclet survived an impeachment attempt in 1876 and did not seek reelection in 1878.

Death and legacy
Dubuclet died on December 18, 1887, in Iberville Parish. His remains were transported and interred in the family tomb in St. Louis Cemetery No. 2 located in New Orleans. In 1990, Dubuclet was inducted into the Louisiana Black History Hall of Fame.

References

1810 births
1887 deaths
State treasurers of Louisiana
African-American people in Louisiana politics
People from Iberville Parish, Louisiana
Louisiana Republicans
19th-century American politicians
African-American politicians during the Reconstruction Era
Businesspeople from Louisiana
American slave owners
Black slave owners in the United States
19th-century American businesspeople